The palatine nerves (descending branches) are distributed to the roof of the mouth, soft palate, tonsil, and lining membrane of the nasal cavity.

Most of their fibers are derived from the sphenopalatine branches of the maxillary nerve.

In older texts, they are usually categorized as three in number: anterior, middle, and posterior. (In newer texts, and in Terminologia anatomica, they are broken down into "greater palatine nerve" and "lesser palatine nerve".)

References

External links
 
 
 Diagram at adi-visuals.com

Peripheral nervous system
Palate